The 2006 WNBA season was the tenth season for the Los Angeles Sparks. The team went for the best record in the West, but were still unable to return to the WNBA Finals, losing in the conference finals to the Sacramento Monarchs, 2 games to 0.

Offseason

Expansion Draft
Laura Macchi was selected by the Chicago Sky in the Expansion Draft.

WNBA Draft

Regular season

Season standings

Season schedule

Player stats

References

Los Angeles Sparks seasons
Los Angeles
Los Angeles Sparks